Stara Kamienna  is a village in the administrative district of Gmina Dąbrowa Białostocka, within Sokółka County, Podlaskie Voivodeship, in north-eastern Poland.

Notable residents 
 general Nikodem Sulik-Sarnowski

Gabriel and Minnie (Karp) Toczko
(Relocated to Hatfield, Massachusetts, USA. 1900AD

References

Stara Kamienna